Gajularega is a census town in Vizianagaram district  in the state of Andhra Pradesh, India.

Demographics
 India census, Gajularega had a population of 13,078. Males constitute 50% of the population and females 50%. Gajularega has an average literacy rate of 60%, higher than the national average of 59.5%: male literacy is 69%, and female literacy is 51%. In Gajularega, 13% of the population is under 6 years of age.

References

Villages in Vizianagaram district